Manager Singh (20 January 1920 – 28 October 1993), widely known as Malviya of Dwaba or JanNayak (leader of the common people), was an Indian independence activist and political leader. He is especially remembered for promoting the educational system and his anti-corruption efforts. He was elected five times as the MLA from Dwaba constituency. Manager Singh was born in Karmanpur village of Ballia District of Uttar Pradesh. He is worshipped and glorified by people of Ballia District of Uttar Pradesh.

References

1920 births
1995 deaths
Indian independence activists from Uttar Pradesh
Indian anti-corruption activists